Sathyandranath Ragunanan "Mac" Maharaj (born 22 April 1936 in Newcastle, Natal) is a retired South African politician affiliated with the African National Congress, academic and businessman of Indian origin. He was the official spokesperson of the former President of South Africa, Jacob Zuma.

Anti-apartheid activism

Maharaj was a political activist and member of the then banned South African Communist Party, who worked in a clandestine manner on anti-apartheid activities with Nelson Mandela. In July 1964, Maharaj was arrested in Johannesburg, charged and convicted with four others including Laloo Chiba and Wilton Mkwayi on charges of sabotage in the little Rivonia Trial, and was imprisoned on Robben Island with Mandela, Walter Sisulu, Govan Mbeki and other revolutionary prisoners. In prison he secretly transcribed parts of Mandela's memoir Long Walk to Freedom and smuggled it out of the prison in 1976.

During his time in prison, Maharaj completed a B.Admin, an MBA and the second year of a B.Sc degree before his release on 8 December 1976.

After being released from the Robben Island prison in 1976, Maharaj was deployed by the ANC to Zambia in 1977. He was elected to the National Executive Committee of the ANC in 1985. From 1988 to 1990 Maharaj worked underground in South Africa as part of the ANC's Operation Vula, which was a project to infiltrate the ANC's top leaders back into South Africa. During this time Maharaj worked with Schabir Shaik's two brothers, Yunis Shaik and Moe Shaik, also members of the ANC. Maharaj reported to the then ANC intelligence chief Jacob Zuma.

Role in government

He was appointed South Africa's new Minister of Transport on 11 May 1994, a post he kept until the general election of 1999.

Private sector

After the national elections of 1999, Mac Maharaj stepped down from politics, then joined FirstRand Bank as its highest paid non-executive director.

Controversies

In February 2003 the South African newspaper, The Sunday Times, published allegations that Mac Maharaj and his wife Zarina had received more than R500,000 between May 1998 and February 1999 from a businessman, Schabir Shaik, who had shared in two multi-million rand contracts awarded by the Ministry of Transport whilst Maharaj was Minister.
In August 2003 Maharaj resigned from FirstRand Bank following the media furor around the allegations of corruption.

In March 2007 the South African newspaper, City Press, published allegations that Maharaj's wife Zarina opened a Swiss bank account in 1996, and two days after opening it, received over $100,000 into the account from Schabir Shaik. Six months later, in March 1997, the same Swiss account received a further $100,000 from Schabir Shaik.

On 6 July 2011 he was appointed by President Jacob Zuma as his Spokesperson with immediate effect.

In November 2011 the South African newspaper Mail & Guardian attempted to publish further allegations about both Mac and Zarina Maharaj, in relation to their interviews by prosecutors in 2003, but did not do so after Mac Maharaj laid criminal charges against the newspaper for allegedly infringing the laws protecting the secrecy of the 2003 prosecutor interviews.

Maharaj has never been charged by South African prosecutors supposedly because it would have been difficult to prove that Maharaj had corrupt intentions when he and his wife received money from Schabir Shaik.

Academic affiliations

In 2005, he joined the faculty of Bennington College in Vermont, USA.

Quotes

"You don't have to carry a gun to be a freedom fighter."
"Revenge should not be our motivation."

References

Further reading 

 Shades of Difference: Mac Maharaj and the Struggle for South Africa (2007) (foreword by Nelson Mandela) 

1936 births
Living people
Anti-apartheid activists
South African people of Indian descent
Bennington College faculty
Members of the South African Communist Party
South African politicians of Indian descent
South African prisoners and detainees
Inmates of Robben Island
African National Congress politicians
South African Communist Party politicians
Members of the National Assembly of South Africa
Government ministers of South Africa
Members of the Order of Luthuli
UMkhonto we Sizwe personnel